Peter Pomegranate  was a warship of the English Tudor navy, built in 1510. Her name most likely was in honour of Saint Peter and the badge of Queen Catherine of Aragon, a pomegranate.

History 
She had a tonnage of 450 when first built. In 1536 she was rebuilt and enlarged to a tonnage of 600. At that date the name was shortened to Peter (Catherine had fallen out of grace; she died in 1536). The ship's fate is not recorded, but she was last mentioned in records in 1558. Peter Pomegranate was a contemporary of the Mary Rose and, commanded by John Clere, took part in the Battle of the Solent on 19 July 1545 when the Mary Rose was lost.

Named in full in the roster as "Peter Pomgarnarde", she joined Edward Clinton's invasion fleet against Scotland in August 1547. According to an inventory of 1547, the rebuilt Peter had 185 sailors, 185 soldiers, and 30 gunners. Her armaments included; 2 brass demi-cannons; 2 brass culverins; 4 brass demi-culverins; 4 brass sakers; an iron culverin; 3 iron sakers; 9 iron port pieces; 37 iron bases; and 11 hagbuts. There were also 259 yew bows, 160 bills; and 160 Moorish pikes.

See also
 Flor de la Mar
 Jong (ship)
 Great Michael
 Mary Rose
 São João Baptista (galleon)

References

16th-century ships
Rough Wooing
Ships built in Portsmouth